This is a summary of the year 2009 in the Canadian music industry.

Events
 March 29 – The Juno Awards of 2009 are held in Vancouver, British Columbia.
 June 15 – The 2009 Polaris Music Prize 40-album longlist is announced.
 July 7 – The 2009 Polaris Music Prize 10-album shortlist is to be announced.
 September 21 – Fucked Up's album The Chemistry of Common Life is announced as the winner of the 2009 Polaris Music Prize.
 September – K'naan's single "Wavin' Flag" is announced as the official theme song of the 2010 FIFA World Cup.

Albums

A
Apostle of Hustle, Eats Darkness
Marie-Pierre Arthur, Marie-Pierre Arthur
Attack in Black, Years (by One Thousand Fingertips)

B
Jason Bajada, Loveshit
Howie Beck, How to Fall Down in Public
Daniel Bélanger, Nous
Bell Orchestre, As Seen Through Windows
Art Bergmann, Lost Art Bergmann
Justin Bieber, My World
Billy Talent, Billy Talent III
Jully Black, The Black Book
Blue Rodeo, The Things We Left Behind
Will Bonness, Subtle Fire
Brian Borcherdt, Torches/The Ward Colorado Demos
Bruce Peninsula, A Mountain Is a Mouth
Michael Bublé, Crazy Love
By Divine Right, Mutant Message

C
Patricia Cano, This Is the New World
Paul Cargnello, Bras coupé
CFCF, Continent
DJ Champion, Resistance
Classified, Self Explanatory
The Cliks, Dirty King
Leonard Cohen, Live in London
Antoine Corriveau, Ni vu ni connu
Rose Cousins, The Send Off
Eliana Cuevas, Luna Llena
Cuff the Duke, Way Down Here
Amelia Curran, Hunter Hunter

D
The Dardanelles, The Dardanelles
Default, Comes and Goes
Despised Icon, Day of Mourning
Digawolf, Distant Morning Star
Julie Doiron, I Can Wonder What You Did with Your Day
Drake, So Far Gone

E
Emerson Drive, I Believe
Evening Hymns, Spirit Guides

F
Julie Fader, Outside In
Melanie Fiona, The Bridge
Faber Drive, Can't Keep a Secret

G
Gentleman Reg, Jet Black
Hannah Georgas, The Beat Stuff
The Good Lovelies, The Good Lovelies (March), Under the Mistletoe (December)
Jenn Grant, Echoes
Grand Analog, Metropolis Is Burning
Great Lake Swimmers, Lost Channels (March), The Legion Sessions (October)
Emm Gryner, Goddess

H
Handsome Furs, Face Control
Ron Hawkins, 10 Kinds of Lonely
Hayden, The Place Where We Lived
Hedley, The Show Must Go
The Hidden Cameras, Origin:Orphan
Hollerado, Record in a Bag
Hot Panda, Volcano...Bloody Volcano
The Hylozoists, L'Île de sept villes

I
Immaculate Machine, High on Jackson Hill
In-Flight Safety, We Are an Empire, My Dear
Islands, Vapours

J
jacksoul, SOULmate
Jets Overhead, No Nations
The Junction, Another Link in the Chain
Junior Boys, Begone Dull Care

K
K'naan, Troubadour
k-os, Yes!
Kalle Mattson, Whisper Bee

L
Lhasa, Lhasa
Lightning Dust, Infinite Light
Lights, The Listening
The Lovely Feathers, Fantasy of the Lot

M
Ryan MacGrath, In My Own Company
Catherine MacLellan, Water in the Ground
Magneta Lane, Gambling with God
Malajube, Labyrinthes
Dan Mangan, Nice, Nice, Very Nice
Carolyn Mark and NQ Arbuckle, Let's Just Stay Here
Melissa McClelland, Victoria Day
Metric, Fantasies
Amy Millan, Masters of the Burial
Misstress Barbara, I'm No Human
Taylor Mitchell, For Your Consideration
Moneen, The World I Want to Leave Behind
Montag, Hibernation
The Most Serene Republic, ...And the Ever Expanding Universe
MSTRKRFT, Fist of God

N
The New Cities, Lost in City Lights

O
Octoberman, Fortresses
Ohbijou, Beacons
Our Lady Peace, Burn Burn

P
Paper Moon, Only During Thunderstorms
Peaches, I Feel Cream
Pilot Speed, Wooden Bones
Pink Mountaintops, Outside Love
Joel Plaskett, Three
Po' Girl, Deer in the Night
Pony Up!, Stay Gold
Priestess, Prior to the Fire
Propagandhi, Supporting Caste

R
Corin Raymond, There Will Always Be a Small Time
Lee Reed, Introductory Offer
Reverie Sound Revue, Reverie Sound Revue
Amanda Rheaume, Kiss Me Back
Alejandra Ribera, Navigator/Navigateher
Rock Plaza Central, ...at the moment of our most needing
Royal City, Royal City
Ruby Jean and the Thoughtful Bees, Ruby Jean and the Thoughtful Bees
Daniel Romano, Frederick Squire and Julie Doiron, Daniel, Fred & Julie
The Rural Alberta Advantage, Hometowns

S
John K. Samson, City Route 85
Crystal Shawanda, I'll Be Home for Christmas
Shout Out Out Out Out, Reintegration Time
The Slew, 100%
Still Life Still, Girls Come Too
Sunparlour Players, Wave North
Sunset Rubdown, Dragonslayer
Swan Lake, Enemy Mine

T
Tegan and Sara, Sainthood
Think About Life, Family
Three Days Grace, Life Starts Now
Thunderheist, Thunderheist
Thus Owls, Cardiac Malformations 
Tiga, Ciao!
Timber Timbre, Timber Timbre
 Tire le coyote, EP
Torngat, La Petite Nicole
The Tragically Hip, We Are the Same
Two Hours Traffic, Territory

U
Ubiquitous Synergy Seeker, Questamation
United Steel Workers of Montreal, Three on the Tree

V
Various Artists, Friends in Bellwoods II
Various Artists, Great Canadian Song Quest
Various Artists, Record of the Week Club
vitaminsforyou, He Closed His Eyes So He Could Dance with You
Roch Voisine, Americana II

W
Martha Wainwright, Sans Fusils, Ni Souliers, à Paris: Martha Wainwright's Piaf Record
Patrick Watson, Wooden Arms
Wax Mannequin, Saxon
WHOOP-Szo, Where I Dream Is Where I Live
The Wooden Sky, If I Don't Come Home You'll Know I'm Gone

Y
Years, Years
You Say Party! We Say Die!, XXXX
Young Galaxy, Invisible Republic

Z
Zeus, Sounds Like Zeus

Top hits on record

Top 10 albums
These are the top selling albums in Canada. These albums consist of Canadian sales only.

Top 10 American albums

Top 10 British albums

Top International albums

Canadian Hot 100 Year-End List

Deaths
January 31 – Dewey Martin, rock drummer
March 15 – Edmund Hockridge, singer and actor
March 22 – Archie Green, folklorist and musicologist
May 3 – Renée Morisset, pianist
June 27 – Jackie Washington, blues musician
October 28 – Taylor Mitchell, folk singer-songwriter
November 22 – Haydain Neale, soul/R&B singer

References